Ron Casey may refer to:

 Ron Casey (Melbourne broadcaster) (1927−2000), Australian broadcaster, television executive and Australian rules football administrator
 Ron Casey (Sydney broadcaster) (1929−2018), Australian television presenter and talk-back radio host
 Ron Casey, American drummer of Brain Drill
 Ron Casey (editor) (1951−2000), Pulitzer Prize–winning editorial writer from the United States
 Ron Casey (Canadian politician) (born c. 1950), Alberta, Canada, politician
 Ron Casey (Missouri politician) (1952−2014), state representative